Polycarbonyl, (also known as polymeric-CO, p-CO or poly-CO) is a solid, metastable, and explosive polymer of carbon monoxide. The polymer is produced by exposing carbon monoxide to high pressures.  The structure of the solid appears amorphous, but may include a zig zag of equally-spaced CO groups.

Formation
Poly-CO can be produced at pressures of 5.2 GPa; it is amorphous and yellow to dark red in color. Polymerisation is catalysed by blue light at slightly lower pressures in the δ-phase of solid CO. Another white, crystalline phase can be made at higher temperatures at 6 or 7 GPa.

R. J. Mills discovered this solid, which was first produced in a tungsten carbide anvil in 1947.  Originally this was thought to be polymeric carbon suboxide, but the formation does not yield any gas byproduct such as carbon dioxide. The yield of the solid can be up to 95%.

Properties
The polymer is stable above about 80K.  Below this temperature the ε form of solid molecular CO is formed instead.  When the pressure is released the polymer remains stable at atmospheric pressure.  The solid dissolves in water, alcohol and acetone. When exposed to the atmosphere it is hygroscopic, becomes gluey, and changes colour, becoming darker. The reaction with water produces carboxylic groups.

The solid stores a high energy.  It can decompose explosively forming glassy carbon and carbon dioxide. The energy density stored can be up to 8 kJ/g. During the decomposition the temperature can be 2500K. The density is 1.65 gcm−3, however most of the solid produced is porous, so the true density is likely to be higher.

Infrared spectroscopy shows bands at 650, 1210, 1440, 1650 and 1760 cm−1.  The 1760 band is likely to be due to the -C-(C=O)-C- structure. The 1600 is due to vibration of a C=C double bond.

The solid is electrically insulating with an electronic gap energy of 1.9 eV.

Nuclear magnetic resonance for the material made from 13CO shows sharp resonance at 223 ppm due to ester or lactone attached carbon, and 151 ppm due to C=C double bonds. There is also broad resonance at 109 and 189 ppm. Over time of a few days, the 223 ppm peak reduces and all the other features increase in strength.

Structure
Ideas of the structure include a zig zag chain of CO pointing in opposite directions, or five atom rings connected by CO and  bonds. The rings are lactones of tetronic acid: . Interconnections between the rings are zig zags of CO.

Other ideas of the structure of the solid, include graphitic carbon with carbon dioxide under pressure, and a polymer with this  monomer: . Yet other ideas are that the solid is the same as the polymer of carbon suboxide with oxalic anhydride.

References

Other reading

Oxocarbons
Explosive chemicals
Explosive polymers